Wabash County is the name of two counties in the United States:

 Wabash County, Illinois
 Wabash County, Indiana